Joaquin Szuchman (born January 29, 1995) is an Israeli-Argentine professional basketball player for Hapoel Be'er Sheva of the Israeli Basketball Premier League. Szuchman, a 1.91 m (6' 3") tall shooting guard, is primarily known for his defensive skills. He was the 2018  Israeli Basketball Premier League Defensive Player of the Year.

Early life
Szuchman is Jewish, and was born in Concordia, Argentina. Szuchman lived his first 7 years in Argentina before growing up in Nahariya and later in Moshav Barak, Israel. He played for Hapoel Gilboa Galil youth team and Emek Charod high-school team.

Professional career
In 2012, Szuchman started his professional career with Hapoel Gilboa Galil. On April 11, 2013, Szuchman made his professional debut in a match against Elitzur Ashkelon.

On August 27, 2015, Szuchman was named Gilboa Galil's team captain. Szuchman, alongside his teammates Demetrius Treadwell and Jason Siggers, helped Gilboa Galil to promote to the Israeli Premier League after they defeated Ironi Kiryat Ata in the National League Finals in five games.

On July 12, 2017, Szuchman signed a three-year contract extension with Gilboa Galil. On December 28, 2017, Szuchman was named Israeli Player of the Month for games played in December. On April 1, 2018, Szuchman recorded 17 points along with 5 assists and 5 steals in a 90–76 win over Maccabi Rishon LeZion. He was subsequently named Israeli League Round 22 MVP. On May 10, 2018, Szuchman recorded a career-high 22 points, shooting 9-of-16 from the field, along with 7 assists, 3 rebounds and 3 steals in a 78–86 loss to Bnei Herzliya.

Szuchman helped Gilboa Galil reach the 2018 Israeli League Playoffs, where they eventually lost to Hapoel Jerusalem. In June 2018, Szuchman was named the Israeli League Best Defender, and earned a spot in the All-Israeli League Second Team.

On June 25, 2019, Szuchman signed a two-year deal with Hapoel Tel Aviv, joining his former head coach Ariel Beit-Halahmy.

In summer 2022, he signed with Hapoel Be'er Sheva of the Israeli Basketball Premier League.

Israeli national team
Szuchman is a member of the Israeli national basketball team. On November 24, 2017, He made his first appearance for the senior team at the 2019 FIBA Basketball World Cup qualification match against Estonia.

Szuchman was also a member of the Israeli U-18 and U-20 national teams, he also participated at the 2017 Summer Universiade.

References

External links
 RealGM profile
 FIBA profile

1995 births
Living people
Argentine emigrants to Israel
Israeli Jews
Jewish Argentine sportspeople
Jewish men's basketball players
Hapoel Afula players
Hapoel Be'er Sheva B.C. players
Hapoel Gilboa Galil Elyon players
Hapoel Tel Aviv B.C. players
Israeli men's basketball players
Shooting guards